The Antigua black pineapple is a variety of pineapple that is grown on the island of Antigua, in the West Indies. It is known for its sweet and juicy flesh, which is said to have a unique flavor compared to other varieties of pineapple. It is a popular local fruit and is used in a variety of traditional dishes and desserts on the island.

It is exclusively grown on the southwestern coast of Antigua. It is said to be the sweetest variety of pineapple.

References 

Antigua and Barbuda culture